The Glass Hotel is a 2020 novel by Canadian writer Emily St. John Mandel. It is Mandel's fifth novel, and the first since winning the Arthur C. Clarke Award in 2015. It follows the aftermath of a disturbing graffiti incident at a hotel on Vancouver Island and the collapse of an international Ponzi scheme.

Plot summary
Paul is a lonely student at the University of Toronto. At a nightclub, he gives some tablets to some people he is hoping to befriend and one of them dies shortly after. Paul flees to the apartment of his half-sister Vincent.

Five years later, Paul and Vincent work at a hotel on the northernmost tip of Vancouver Island in the fictional Caiette, which is based on the real hamlet Quatsino. Some graffiti is discovered written on a window in the lobby with an acid marker, saying, "Why don't you swallow broken glass". Paul is immediately suspected and soon fired. The graffiti would appear to be intended for Jonathan Alkaitis, a wealthy investor who owns the hotel. Vincent, who is working the bar, soon enters into a relationship with Alkaitis and moves into his house in Connecticut. Her life becomes one of extreme wealth and accommodating her partner.

Alkaitis is arrested and it is revealed that his investment success is a Ponzi scheme. His complicit staff reacts in different ways to their impending demise. One flees the country, another writes an elaborate confession. Alkaitis is sentenced to 170 years in prison, where he dreams of a "counter-life" in which he escaped to a hotel in Dubai. He is often haunted by the people he defrauded.

After the collapse of the scheme, Vincent discovers that Paul has taken old videotapes of hers as the basis for musical compositions. Refusing to confront him, she takes a job as a cook on a shipping freighter. She disappears from the ship in the midst of a storm. Her onboard boyfriend is suspected of killing her. Leon Prevant, who lost his life savings investing with Alkaitis, is sent to help investigate. His co-investigator instructs him to cover up possibly incriminating evidence from an interview. 

Paul finds some success as a composer. He has a long-term heroin addiction.

Inspiration
Jonathan Alkaitis' Ponzi scheme is based on the crimes of Bernie Madoff. Mandel said, "I do want to be clear about this book: it's not about any real people. It's not about Madoff — or Madoff's family or Madoff's actual staff — but the crime is the same. That was my starting point. The thing that fascinated me the most was the staff involved. I found myself thinking, 'Who are these people who show up at work every morning to perpetuate a massive crime?'"

As with Station Eleven (2014), Mandel is inspired by the "invisible world" of shipping and the "ghost fleet" of freighters off the shore of Malaysia after the global financial crisis in 2008. The Glass Hotel includes a reference to the "Georgia flu," the illness which drove the plot of Station Eleven, but adds that the illness never became a pandemic, and two characters from Station Eleven (shipping consultants Miranda and Leon) appear in The Glass Hotel.

Television series
In April 2022, it was announced that HBO Max will be adapting the novel into a television series, produced by Paramount Television Studios with Mandel and Patrick Somerville co-writing.

Reception
At the review aggregator website Book Marks, which assigns individual ratings to book reviews from mainstream literary critics, the novel received a cumulative "Rave" rating based on 47 reviews: six "Mixed", and the others either "Rave" or "Positive".

The Atlantic said, "The Glass Hotel is a jigsaw puzzle missing its box. At the book's start, what exactly it is about or even who the major figures are is unclear. The structure is virtuosic, as the fragments of the story coalesce by the end of the narrative into a richly satisfying shape. There are wonderful moments of lyricism." The New Yorker said, "Mandel's gift is to weave realism out of extremity. She plants her flag where the ordinary and the astonishing meet, where everyday people pause to wonder how, exactly, it came to this. She is our bard of waking up in the wrong timeline."

NPR claimed, "In Vincent and Paul, Mandel has created two of the most memorable characters in recent American [sic] fiction. The two are both haunted by longing and self-doubt, trying in vain to run away from their respective demons." Seth Mandel at The Washington Examiner agreed, "Mandel's characters are crisply drawn, all sharp lines and living color. Everyone in the book is witty; no one is particularly likable. But taken together, their overlapping stories are gripping."

Former USA President Barack Obama included the book in his list of favorites books of 2020.

Awards and nominations
 Shortlist, 2020 Giller Prize
 Longlist, 2021 Andrew Carnegie Medal for Excellence in Fiction

References

2020 Canadian novels
2020 speculative fiction novels
Novels by Emily St. John Mandel
Canadian speculative fiction novels
Fraud in fiction
Ghosts in written fiction
HarperCollins books
Nonlinear narrative novels
Novels set in Connecticut
Novels set in New York City
Novels set in Toronto
Novels set in Vancouver